Lung Mei is a village in the Plover Cove area of Tai Po District, Hong Kong. It is located on the northern shore of Plover Cove in the west of Tai Mei Tuk.

Administration
Lung Mei is a recognized village under the New Territories Small House Policy. It is one of the villages represented within the Tai Po Rural Committee. For electoral purposes, Lung Mei is part of the Shuen Wan constituency, which was formerly represented by So Tat-leung until October 2021.

History
Lung Mei was established before 1733. Historically, Ting Kok, together with the nearby Hakka villages of Shan Liu, Lai Pik Shan, Lo Tsz Tin, Lung Mei and Tai Mei Tuk belonged to the Ting Kok Yeuk alliance.

In February 2023, the dismembered body of Abby Choi Tin-fung was found in the village.

References

External links

 Delineation of area of existing village Lung Mei (Tai Po) for election of resident representative (2019 to 2022)
 Antiquities Advisory Board. Historic Building Appraisal. Nos. 13 & 14 Lung Mei, Tai Po Pictures
 Antiquities Advisory Board. Historic Building Appraisal. Chan Ancestral Hall, Lung Mei, Tai Po Pictures

Villages in Tai Po District, Hong Kong